Michael Curtis "Mike" Sauer (born August 7, 1987) is an American former professional ice hockey defenseman who played three seasons in the National Hockey League (NHL) with the New York Rangers. He is the younger brother of Phoenix Coyotes defenseman Kurt Sauer, and of former Atlanta Falcons and Minnesota Vikings (NFL) linebacker Craig Sauer. Sauer was born in St. Cloud, Minnesota, but grew up in Sartell, Minnesota.

Playing career
He was drafted in the 2nd round, 40th overall by the New York Rangers in the 2005 NHL Entry Draft; the Rangers acquired this draft pick from the Toronto Maple Leafs as part of the Brian Leetch trade a year prior.

Sauer signed his first professional contract with the Rangers on August 8, 2006.  He played for the Rangers' minor league affiliate in Hartford of the AHL for most of the 2007-2008 and 2008-2009 seasons, and was promoted to the Rangers on March 23, 2009. He made his NHL debut with the Rangers at Madison Square Garden on March 24, 2009, against the Minnesota Wild.

After spending all of 2009 with Hartford, Sauer began the 2010 season in the NHL with the Rangers, and was in the Rangers' opening night lineup.  He scored his first NHL goal on December 9, 2010, against Brian Elliott of the Ottawa Senators. On July 8, 2011, Sauer, a restricted free agent, re-signed with the Rangers to a two-year, $2.5 million deal.

Sauer suffered a concussion as a result of a hard hit by Dion Phaneuf on December 5, 2011. No penalty was assessed and he has not played since. After the 2012-13 season, Sauer's contract expired and he did not receive a qualifying offer, making him an unrestricted free agent.

Career statistics

References

External links

Hockey's Future profile

1987 births
American men's ice hockey defensemen
Hartford Wolf Pack players
Ice hockey players from Minnesota
Living people
Medicine Hat Tigers players
New York Rangers draft picks
New York Rangers players
Sportspeople from St. Cloud, Minnesota
People from Sartell, Minnesota
Portland Winterhawks players